Jure Radelj (born 26 November 1977) is a Slovenian former ski jumper who competed from 1993 to 2006. At World Cup level he scored three top-10 individual finishes, with the highest being sixth in Kuopio on 2 December 2000. He also scored six top-10 finishes in team competitions, with the highest being fourth in Park City on 19 January 2001.

External links

1977 births
Living people
Slovenian male ski jumpers
Skiers from Ljubljana
21st-century Slovenian people